Saul Weprin (August 5, 1927 – February 11, 1994) was an American attorney and politician. He was a Democratic member from Queens County of the New York State Assembly, and served as its Speaker from December 1991 until his death.

Biography
Saul Weprin was born in Brooklyn, to Jewish parents who had emigrated from the Kyiv area. He went to Thomas Jefferson High School in Brooklyn, and graduated from Brooklyn College in 1948 and Brooklyn Law School in 1951. He practiced law at the Manhattan law firm of Thelen, Marrin, Johnson & Bridges until he became Speaker of the New York State Assembly in 1991. He served in the United States Coast Guard in 1945.
 
In the late 1950s he became president of his cooperative apartment board in Hollis, Queens, in 1962 he became Democratic leader of the 24th Assembly District. On November 2, 1971, Weprin was elected to the New York State Assembly, to fill the vacancy caused by the resignation of Martin Rodell, and took his seat in the 179th New York State Legislature during the special session in December 1971. Weprin was re-elected several times, and remained in the Assembly until his death in 1994, sitting also in the 180th, 181st, 182nd, 183rd, 184th, 185th, 186th, 187th, 188th, 189th, 190th New York State Legislatures. There he served as chairman of the Commerce Committee and the Judiciary Committee. In 1986, he tried to become Speaker after Stanley Fink announced his resignation, but lost to Mel Miller. In 1987, he got the post of Ways and Means Committee chairman, and was instrumental in developing the Tax Reform and Reduction Act, one of the largest tax cuts in American history. On December 16, 1991, he was elected Speaker "after a lightning-like round of politicking by telephone among the Democrats in the Assembly", after Speaker Mel Miller had lost his seat in the Assembly upon being convicted on federal fraud charges, later overturned on appeal.

Weprin was an opponent of the death penalty and a supporter of abortion rights. He pushed the first gay rights bill through the Assembly, sought to increase state aid for schools in New York, and defended the state's Medicaid and welfare programs against cuts proposed by the Republican-controlled Senate.

Personal life
Weprin married Sylvia Matz in 1950, a biology teacher, who was born in Cuba and emigrated to the United States with her family in 1938, when she was eight years old. He died on February 11, 1994, at the Long Island Jewish Medical Center in Queens from complications resulting from a stroke.

The couple had three sons, Barry Weprin, an attorney in New York, Mark Weprin, who won his father's former seat, and served in the Assembly until January 2010, when he was elected to the New York City Council seat vacated by his brother David Weprin, who, after an unsuccessful run for New York City Comptroller, succeeded him in the Assembly in 2010.

References

1927 births
1994 deaths
1992 United States presidential electors
20th-century American politicians
American people of Ukrainian-Jewish descent
Brooklyn College alumni
Brooklyn Law School alumni
Jewish American state legislators in New York (state)
People from Hollis, Queens
Politicians from Brooklyn
Speakers of the New York State Assembly
Democratic Party members of the New York State Assembly
Thomas Jefferson High School (Brooklyn) alumni
20th-century American Jews